Harburger is a surname. Notable people with the name include:

Edmund Harburger (1846–1906), German painter and draftsman
Julius Harburger (1850–1914), New York City politician

See also
Harburger Berge (English: Harburg Hills), are a low ridge in the northeastern part of the German state 
Harburger Theater, is a theatre in Hamburg, Germany